Tyler MacKay (born January 15, 1980) is a Canadian former professional ice hockey goaltender. He last played for the Florida Everblades of the ECHL during the 2004–05 season.

Awards and honours

Career statistics

References

1980 births
Living people
Adirondack IceHawks players
Atlantic City Boardwalk Bullies players
Canadian ice hockey goaltenders
Florida Everblades players
Ice hockey people from Saskatchewan
Saskatoon Blades players
Spokane Chiefs players
Wheeling Nailers players